Georges Meunier (Vierzon, 9 May 1925 – 13 December 2015) was a French professional road bicycle racer. He won two stages in the Tour de France. In 1960, he became French national cyclo-cross champion.

Major results

1950
Tour de France:
9th place overall classification
1951
Tour de France:
Winner stage 3
1953
Tour de France:
Winner stage 19
1955
Grand-Bourg
Saint-Amand
1956
GP de la Trinité
1957
Brive
1960
 national cyclo-cross championships

External links 

Official Tour de France results for Georges Meunier

1925 births
2015 deaths
People from Vierzon
French male cyclists
French Tour de France stage winners
Cyclo-cross cyclists
Sportspeople from Cher (department)
Cyclists from Centre-Val de Loire